Blue Bay is a location of The Entrance district within  the Central Coast region of New South Wales, Australia, located on a peninsula between Tuggerah Lake and the Pacific Ocean south of The Entrance. It is part of the  local government area.

Blue Bay is served by  The Entrance for retail, commercial, education, and recreation services. Blue Bay beach has toilet and outdoor showers.

References

Suburbs of the Central Coast (New South Wales)
Bays of New South Wales